Julie Jones may refer to:

Julie-Ann Jones, a fictional character in the UK soap opera Family Affairs
Julie Victoria Jones, fantasy author
Julie Carp, née Julie Jones, fictional character in Coronation Street

See also
Julia Jones (disambiguation)